Lisa LaTrelle Blunt Rochester (née Blunt; born February 10, 1962) is an American politician serving as the U.S. representative for  since 2017. A member of the Democratic Party, she is the first woman and first African American to represent Delaware in Congress.

Early life and education 
Blunt Rochester was born in Philadelphia, Pennsylvania, on February 10, 1962. Her family moved to Wilmington, Delaware, in 1969. Her father, Ted Blunt, served on the Wilmington City Council, including as council president. Her mother, Alice LaTrelle, worked in retail.

Blunt Rochester attended Padua Academy, began college at Villanova University, and later transferred to the University of Delaware in her sophomore year. She left college to live in Europe, and later received her bachelor's degree in international relations from Fairleigh Dickinson University and her master's degree in urban affairs and public policy from the University of Delaware.

Early political career 
Blunt Rochester worked for Tom Carper as an intern in 1989, when he served as Delaware's U.S. Representative. After the internship, she continued to work for Carper as a constituent relations caseworker, and worked on his transition team when he was elected governor of Delaware. Carper appointed her deputy secretary of the Department of Health and Social Services in 1993 and Secretary of the Department of Labor in 1998. Governor Ruth Ann Minner named Blunt Rochester the state personnel director in 2001.

In 2004, Blunt Rochester left government service and became the CEO of the Metropolitan Wilmington Urban League.

U.S. House of Representatives

Elections 

She won the Democratic Party nomination on September 13 and the general election against Republican Hans Reigle on November 8. When she was sworn into office on January 3, 2017, she became the first woman and the first African-American to represent Delaware in Congress. During her swearing-in, she carried a scarf imprinted with her great-great-great-grandfather's Reconstruction Era voter registration card. He had been a slave.

Tenure 
On December 18, 2019, Blunt Rochester voted for both articles of impeachment against President Donald Trump.

During the 2021 storming of the United States Capitol, Blunt Rochester was ushered into a secure room with fellow members of Congress. Despite House rules on mask mandates, multiple Republican members, including Marjorie Taylor Greene of Georgia, abstained from wearing a mask. A clip went viral of Blunt Rochester offering masks to her Republican colleagues, in which they seemingly mocked and refused her offer. In the following days, multiple members tested positive for COVID-19.

Blunt Rochester voted to impeach Trump a second time on January 15, 2021.

2020 presidential election 
Blunt Rochester played an active role in the 2020 presidential election. After Joe Biden became the presumptive Democratic nominee in March 2020, his campaign named her one of its co-chairs. At the end of April, Blunt Rochester was named a member of the vetting committee for Biden's vice presidential candidate selection.

Rochester was a 2020 Democratic National Convention speaker.

Syria 
In 2023, Blunt Rochester was among 56 Democrats to vote in favor of H.Con.Res. 21, which directed President Joe Biden to remove U.S. troops from Syria within 180 days.

Committee assignments 
 Committee on Energy and Commerce
 Subcommittee on Health
 Subcommittee on Environment and Climate Change
 Subcommittee on Energy

Caucus memberships 
 Congressional Black Caucus
 Congressional Progressive Caucus
 Future of Work Caucus (Founder / Co-Chair)
New Democrat Coalition

Personal life 
Blunt Rochester was married to her first husband, basketball player Alex Bradley, from 1982 to 2003. They met at Villanova University and lived in Europe while he played basketball professionally. They have two children together. She met her second husband, Charles, later in 2003. They married in 2006. Charles died in 2014. He ruptured his Achilles tendon which caused blood clots to go to his heart and lungs.

Blunt Rochester identifies as a Protestant.

While living abroad in China with her then-husband, Blunt Rochester co-authored the book Thrive: 34 Women, 18 Countries, One Goal.

Electoral history

Book

See also 
 List of African-American United States representatives
 Women in the United States House of Representatives

References

External links 

 Congresswoman Lisa Blunt Rochester official U.S. House website
 Campaign website
 

 

|-

1962 births
21st-century American women politicians
21st-century American politicians
African-American members of the United States House of Representatives
African-American state cabinet secretaries
African-American people in Delaware politics
African-American Christians
American expatriates in China
American Protestants
Christians from Delaware
Democratic Party members of the United States House of Representatives from Delaware
Fairleigh Dickinson University alumni
Female members of the United States House of Representatives
Joe Biden 2020 presidential campaign
Living people
People from Wilmington, Delaware
Protestants from Delaware
State cabinet secretaries of Delaware
University of Delaware alumni
Women in Delaware politics